Lăpuș may refer to several entities in Romania:
 Lăpuș, a commune and village in Maramureș County
 Lăpuș (river), a tributary of the Someș in Maramureș County
 Lăpuş Mountains, a subgroup of the Eastern Carpathians
 Târgu Lăpuș, a town in Maramureș County

Lăpușnicu 
 Lăpușnicu Mare, a commune in Caraș-Severin County, western Romania
 Lăpușnicu River, a tributary of the Nera River in Romania

Lăpușnicul 
 Lăpușnicul Mic, a tributary of the Râul Mare in Hunedoara County, Romania

See also
 Lapus (disambiguation)
 Lăpușna (disambiguation)
 Lăpușel (disambiguation)
 Lăpușnic (disambiguation)
 Lăpușna County (Romania), a former county in the Kingdom of Romania,
 Lăpușna County (Moldova), a former administrative region of Moldova
 Lăpușnicel, a commune in Caraș-Severin County, western Romania
 Lăpușani, a village in Coșești, Argeş Commune, Romania
 Lăpușata, a commune located in Vâlcea County, Romania
 Lăpuștești, a village in Râșca, Cluj Commune, Romania
 Lăpugiu de Jos, a commune in Hunedoara County, Romania